Margaret Houston may refer to:

 Margaret Bell Houston (1877–1966), American writer and suffragist
 Margaret Lea Houston (1819–1867), First Lady of the Republic of Texas